John Godeley (or John Godele) was a medieval Bishop of Exeter elect.

Godeley was elected between 5 July and 31 August 1327, but his election was quashed in 1327.

Citations

References

 

Year of birth missing
Year of death missing
Bishops of Exeter
14th-century English people